The 2013–14 Liga Gimel season saw 113 clubs competing in 8 regional divisions for promotion to Liga Bet.

Hapoel Ironi Safed (Upper Galilee), Maccabi Ironi Yafa (Lower Galilee), F.C. al-Nahda Nazareth (Jezreel), F.C. Baqa (Samaria), Hapoel Kafr Qasim Shouaa (Sharon), F.C. Roei Heshbon Tel Aviv (Tel Aviv), F.C. Beitar Yavne (Central) and Hapoel Merhavim (South) all won their respective divisions and were promoted to Liga Bet.

During the summer, as several vacancies were created in Liga Bet, runners-up Hapoel Ironi Bnei I'billin (Lower Galilee), Hapoel Sandala Gilboa (Jezreel), F.C. Pardes Hanna-Karkur (Samaria), F.C. Bnei Ra'anana (Sharon) and A.S. Holon (Tel Aviv) were also promoted to Liga Bet.

Upper Galilee Division

Lower Galilee Division

During the season, Hapoel Bnei Jadeidi-Makr and Hapoel Bnei Makr (after 17 matches) both folded and their results were annulled.

Jezreel Division

After playing one match, Hapoel Muawiya folded and their result was annulled.

Samaria Division

Sharon Division

Tel Aviv Division

Central Division

South Division

References
Liga Gimel Upper Galilee The Israel Football Association 
Liga Gimel Lower Galilee The Israel Football Association 
Liga Gimel Jezreel The Israel Football Association 
Liga Gimel Samaria The Israel Football Association 
Liga Gimel Sharon The Israel Football Association 
Liga Gimel Tel Aviv The Israel Football Association 
Liga Gimel Central The Israel Football Association 
Liga Gimel South The Israel Football Association 

Liga Gimel seasons
5
Israel